"I Will Whisper Your Name" is a song written by Randy VanWarmer, and recorded by American country pop artist Michael Johnson.  It was released in April 1988 as the second single from the album That's That.  The song reached #7 on the Billboard Hot Country Singles & Tracks chart.

Charts

Weekly charts

Year-end charts

References

1988 singles
1987 songs
Michael Johnson (singer) songs
Songs written by Randy VanWarmer
RCA Records singles
Song recordings produced by Brent Maher